The 1990 Colorado gubernatorial election was held on November 6, 1990. Incumbent Democrat Roy Romer defeated Republican nominee John Andrews with 61.89% of the vote.

Primary elections
Primary elections were held on August 14, 1990.

Democratic primary

Candidates
Roy Romer, incumbent Governor

Results

Republican primary

Candidates
John Andrews, businessman

Results

General election

Candidates
Major party candidates
Roy Romer, Democratic
John Andrews, Republican

Other candidates
David Aitken, Libertarian
David Livingston, Prohibition

Results

References

1990
Colorado
Gubernatorial